

Early life 

Nandiesha Reddy comes from a family of farmers. His Father was Late Kote Srinivasa Reddy. Kote Family have been landlords.
Sri Nandiesha Reddy is into Seri-culture and Agriculture in Bangarpet Taluk, Kolar District.

Personal Details 
Kote N S Nandiesha Reddy his formal induction in social service started with Rashtriya Swayamsevak Sangh (RSS), a socio-cultural organization, dedicated to the service of the Nation. While serving in the RSS for about Two decades, He was working very actively in youth wing of BJP (ABVP) in his college days and He was also actively participating and pursuing  mainstream politics. He began his political career as a youth leader in 1999 and active member of the BJP since then. He got a chance to work with Senior leaders in grass root level from the year 2001 and worked for Party in Zilla Panchayath, Taluk Panchayath & Legislative Council Elections for Bengaluru Area. In consideration of his contribution, the Party appointed his as in-charge of Varthur Constituency for the 2004 elections. In 2008 he was awarded with BJP ticket to contest from K R Puram Assembly Constituency, in which he won by defeating Former Minister Shri A Krishnappa.

As MLA, he has worked towards the development of Constituency by solving public grievances on priority and by interacting with public through social media and also at a personal level, with main agenda to resolve issues like water, roads and sewage and was able to achieve success during his tenure.

In 2013 state assembly elections Reddy lost to B.A. Basavaraja of Indian National Congress by a considerable margin. For 2018 Karnataka state assembly elections, Reddy will be facing a tough battle against B.A Basavaraja of INC.

References

http://www.thehindu.com/news/cities/bangalore/why-was-nandish-reddy-in-the-returning-officers-room/article3482843.ece
http://www.dnaindia.com/bangalore/report-karnataka-home-minister-faces-bjp-corporators-ire-on-standing-committees-1684281
http://www.thehindu.com/news/cities/bangalore/a-long-wait-for-basic-infrastructure/article4640583.ece
http://www.deccanherald.com/content/327447/with-elections-nearing-water-takes.html
http://www.oneindia.com/india/four-more-firs-filed-against-yeddyurappa-1784173.html
http://www.indiainfoline.com/article/news/scalene-launches-innovative-clean-energy-4957860831_1.html
https://www.youtube.com/watch?v=JZC_ko7RJ68

External links
 

1971 births
Living people
Bharatiya Janata Party politicians from Karnataka
Karnataka MLAs 2008–2013
Politicians from Bangalore